Blueberry Hill is a restaurant and music club located in the Delmar Loop neighborhood in University City, a suburb of St. Louis, Missouri. Until October 2014, Chuck Berry performed there the third Wednesday of each month, in the Duck Room. 

The restaurant is considered a St. Louis landmark, drawing tourists and locals during the day, and then becoming a popular hangout for university students in the evening, mostly from nearby Washington University.  The restaurant is famous for its decor, its cheeseburger and its darts room. It is frequently mentioned by St. Louis-based announcer Bob Costas.  

Joe Edwards and Linda Edwards opened Blueberry Hill on September 8, 1972. Since opening, the restaurant has expanded into the adjacent spaces on the east and the west, and it now occupies an entire block of Delmar Boulevard.

Outside the restaurant is the St. Louis Walk of Fame, the work of Joe Edwards. The Walk lines the sidewalks on both sides of Delmar, and is made up of bronze stars and informative biographical plaques honoring individuals from the St. Louis area who have made major national contributions to US cultural heritage.

References

External links
Blueberry Hill
St. Louis Walk of Fame

Restaurants in Missouri
Music venues in St. Louis
Restaurants established in 1972
1972 establishments in Missouri
Buildings and structures in St. Louis County, Missouri
Tourist attractions in St. Louis